The 2021 Asian Wrestling Olympic Qualification Tournament was the fourth and final regional qualifying tournament for the 2020 Summer Olympics. The event was held from 9 to 11 April 2021, in Almaty, Kazakhstan. The 2021 Asian Wrestling Championships were held at the same venue.

Qualification summary 
A total of 36 athletes secured a spot in the 2020 Summer Olympics, in Tokyo, Japan. Two spots were given to each of the weight classes in every event. This allows a total of 12 available spots for each event. Every winner and runner-up per class were awarded their place for wrestling, at the 2020 Summer Olympics. Quota places are allocated to the respective NOC and not to the competitor that achieved the place in the qualification event.

Men's freestyle

57 kg
11 April

65 kg
11 April

74 kg
11 April

86 kg
11 April

97 kg
11 April

125 kg
11 April

Men's Greco-Roman

60 kg
9 April

67 kg
9 April

77 kg
9 April

87 kg
9 April

97 kg
9 April

130 kg
9 April

Women's freestyle

50 kg
10 April

53 kg
10 April

57 kg
10 April

62 kg
10 April

68 kg
10 April

76 kg
10 April

See also 
2020 Pan American Wrestling Olympic Qualification Tournament
2021 European Wrestling Olympic Qualification Tournament
2021 African & Oceania Wrestling Olympic Qualification Tournament
2021 World Wrestling Olympic Qualification Tournament

References

External links
United World Wrestling

Qualification America
Olympic Q Asia
Asian Wrestling Olympic Qualification Tournament
Asian Wrestling Olympic Qualification Tournament
International wrestling competitions hosted by Kazakhstan
Sports competitions in Almaty